Plant Pathology is a peer-reviewed scientific journal published by Wiley-Blackwell in association with the British Society for Plant Pathology. It was established in 1952 and was originally published by the Ministry of Agriculture. The journal publishes research articles and critical reviews on all aspects of plant pathology except for articles on pesticide and resistance screening. The editor-in-chief is Matt Dickinson.

References

External links 
 

Phytopathology
Wiley-Blackwell academic journals
Botany journals
Bimonthly journals
English-language journals
Publications established in 1952